Daniella Paulina van den Berg (born 24 May 1996 at Paradera, Aruba) is an Aruban swimmer. At the 2012 Summer Olympics, she competed in the Women's 800 metre freestyle, finishing in 34th place overall in the heats, failing to qualify for the final.

References

Aruban female swimmers
Living people
Olympic swimmers of Aruba
Swimmers at the 2012 Summer Olympics
Aruban female freestyle swimmers
Swimmers at the 2011 Pan American Games
Pan American Games competitors for Aruba
1996 births
Swimmers at the 2015 Pan American Games
Swimmers at the 2014 Summer Youth Olympics